Elias Salhab (born 18 March 1925) is a Lebanese former sports shooter. He competed at the 1960, 1968 and the 1972 Summer Olympics.

References

External links
 

1925 births
Possibly living people
Lebanese male sport shooters
Olympic shooters of Lebanon
Shooters at the 1960 Summer Olympics
Shooters at the 1968 Summer Olympics
Shooters at the 1972 Summer Olympics